Matthew Lopez is an American playwright and screenwriter. His play The Inheritance, directed by Stephen Daldry, premiered at London's Young Vic in 2018, where it was called "the most important American play of the century." It transferred to the West End later that year, and opened on Broadway In 2019. The Inheritance is the most honored American play in a generation, sweeping the "Best Play" awards in both London and New York including the Tony Award, Olivier Award, Drama Desk Award, Evening Standard Award, London Critics Circle Award, Outer Critics Circle Award, Drama League Award, WhatsOnStage Award, and the Southbank Sky Arts Award. He is the first Latine writer to win the Tony Award for Best Play.

In New York, Lopez's work has been seen off-Broadway with The Whipping Man (Manhattan Theatre Club), and The Legend of Georgia McBride (MCC Theatre), productions that received Obie, Lucille Lortel, Drama Desk, and Outer Critics Circle Awards. Other works include Somewhere and Reverberation (Hartford Stage), The Sentinels (Headlong Theatre, London), and Zoey's Perfect Wedding (Denver Center). As of August 2020, Lopez is writing the musical adaptation of Some Like it Hot (1959).

He has written for HBO and Netflix, developed films with Plan B Entertainment and Working Title Films and is adapting The Legend of Georgia McBride for the screen.

Lopez will be making his directorial debut with the film adaptation of the LGBTQ+ romantic comedy Red, White & Royal Blue for Amazon Studios. In addition to directing the film, Lopez has adapted the script, based on Casey McQuiston's bestselling novel.

Early life and education  
Lopez was born in Panama City, Florida to two public school teachers. His father, born in San Juan, Puerto Rico, is the older brother of actor Priscilla Lopez.  Lopez graduated from the University of South Florida with a bachelor's degree in theatre performance. He is openly gay.

Career

The Whipping Man 

Lopez's breakout play The Whipping Man debuted at Luna Stage in Montclair, New Jersey in 2006 and premiered Off-Broadway at the Manhattan Theatre Club on February 1, 2011, directed by Doug Hughes and starring Andre Braugher and Andre Holland. The Off-Broadway production of The Whipping Man was extended four times, and won the 2011 Obie Award for Performance (Braugher) and the 2011 Lucille Lortel Award for Outstanding Lighting Design. Lopez won the John Gassner New Play Award.

The Whipping Man is set in Richmond, Virginia in the immediate aftermath of the American Civil War and concerns two recently freed slaves encountering their former master. The former slaves, like their former master, identify as Jewish. The play examines the unique occurrence of Passover in 1865 beginning the day after Robert E. Lee's surrender at Appomattox.  It explores the meaning of freedom and the various ways people are enslaved — to addictions, to prejudices.

In his The New York Times review Charles Isherwood called the play "emotionally potent, almost surreal in the layers of meaning it conjures." Braugher and Holland both earned critical acclaim for their performances.

Between 2012 and 2016, The Whipping Man was one of most widely produced plays in America.

Somewhere 

Somewhere premiered at the Old Globe Theatre in San Diego in September 2011, before moving to Hartford Stage, Hartford, Connecticut. Matthew Lopez was the Playwright-in-Residence at the Old Globe Theatre. The play, featuring a majority Latin cast, concerns a theatrical family living in Manhattan in 1959, as West Side Story captured the zeitgeist.  The proposed construction of Lincoln Center and the ensuing demolition of their neighborhood leaves the family to fight for their home and their dreams.  Somewhere was directed by Giovanna Sardelli, and featured Matthew Lopez's aunt Priscilla Lopez. Critics lauded the production, comparing Lopez's writing to Tennessee Williams' The Glass Menagerie.

The story of Somewhere has roots in Lopez's family history. His father was an extra in the 1961 film adaptation of West Side Story, and appears on screen in the playground, just after the prologue

Reverberation 

Lopez's next play Reverberation premiered at Hartford Stage, Hartford, Connecticut running from February 19, 2015, to March 15, directed by Maxwell Williams and starring Luke Macfarlane. The story follows Jonathan, a young gay New Yorker, who spends increasingly more time holed up in his Astoria apartment following a violent attack that has left him afraid to go out into the world. He is befriended by his new upstairs neighbor, Claire, a Holly Golightly-like character who, despite her active social life, is just as afraid and lonely as Jonathan. The play examines how violence – against women, against the LGBTQ community – impacts the lives of those both directly and indirectly affected by it. Charles Isherwood of The New York Times writes that "the play is marked by a perceptiveness about the echoing loneliness that many urban dwellers live with."

The Legend of Georgia McBride 

The Legend of Georgia McBride debuted at Denver Center of Performing Arts in 2014, and premiered Off-Broadway at the Lucille Lortel Theatre in 2015. The play tells the story of Casey, a down-on-his-luck Elvis impersonator who is induced to turn his jumpsuits into dresses and become a drag queen. The play toggles between quippy comedy and show-stopping dance numbers, with Charles Isherwood of The New York Times commenting that the play was "full of sass and good spirits – along with a spritz or two of sentimentality."

In February 2018, New Regency announced it was developing the film adaptation of the play in association with Jim Parsons' production company.

The Inheritance 

Matthew's play The Inheritance, directed by Stephen Daldry, premiered London's Young Vic Theatre in 2018, where it was hailed by The Daily Telegraph as "the most important American play of the century."  It transferred to the Noel Coward Theatre in the West End later that year, and opened on Broadway last autumn. The Inheritance earned eleven nominations for the 74th Tony Awards, including Best Play, as well as eight nominations at the 2019 Laurence Olivier Awards, winning for Best New Play, Best Director (Stephen Daldry), Best Actor (Kyle Soller), and Best Lighting Design (Jon Clark). Lopez received the Evening Standard Award and Critics Circle Theatre Award for Best New Play as well. Sweeping the "Best Play" awards in both London and New York including the Olivier Award, Drama Desk Award, Evening Standard Award, London Critics Circle Award, Outer Critics Circle Award, Drama League Award, WhatsOnStage Award, and the Southbank Sky Arts Award, The Inheritance is the most honoured American play in  generation. Matthew is the first Latino writer to win any of these awards for Best Play. The Inheritance was also selected as the recipient for the GLAAD Media Awards "Outstanding Broadway Production".

Set in New York three decades after the height of the AIDS epidemic, The Inheritance wrestles with what it means to be a gay man today, exploring relationships and connections across age and social class and asking what one generation's responsibilities may be to the next. The play is a loose adaptation of E.M. Forster's novel Howards End.  The premiere featured a cast that included Vanessa Redgrave, John Benjamin Hickey, and Paul Hilton as Forster himself.

The play received widespread critical acclaim and was lauded as an instant modern classic by those who viewed it. The Evening Standard declared the play "a work of rare grace, truth, and beauty."

The play premiered on Broadway at the Ethel Barrymore Theatre on September 27, 2019, in previews, with the official opening on November 17. It won the Tony Award for Best play at the 2021 Tony Awards.

In June 2020, in honor of the 50th anniversary of the first LGBTQ Pride parade, Queerty named him among the fifty heroes "leading the nation toward equality, acceptance, and dignity for all people".

Others 
In October 2020, he signed an overall deal with Amazon Studios.

In September 2021, it was reported that Lopez will be writing the remake of The Bodyguard.

He is also co-writing the musical adaptation of the classic film Some Like it Hot, as well as a feature film adaptation of the novel Leading Men, which centers on Tennessee Williams and his longtime partner Frank Merlo, for Searchlight Pictures.

Awards and nominations 

== References ==

External links
 

Living people
American people of Puerto Rican descent
People from Panama City, Florida
University of South Florida alumni
American male dramatists and playwrights
21st-century American dramatists and playwrights
21st-century American male writers
Obie Award recipients
Writers from Florida
American LGBT writers
Tony Award winners
1977 births